The Old Guard (Italian: Vecchia guardia) is a 1934 Italian drama film directed by Alessandro Blasetti and starring Gianfranco Giachetti, Mino Doro, and Franco Brambilla. It was one several pro-Fascist films made by Blasetti during the era. The film is set in a small Italian town in 1922, where a local group of Fascist blackshirts battle against rival socialists who have called a strike at the hospital. Mario, the young son of Doctor Cardini, is killed in the fighting. The film ends with the March on Rome that brought Benito Mussolini to power.

Although intended as sympathetic to the regime, and the methods by which it came to power, the film was not popular with the Fascist hierarchy who felt its portrayal of violence undermined the respectable image the party was now trying to cultivate.

Cast
 Gianfranco Giachetti as Dott. Claudio Cardini 
 Mino Doro as Roberto 
 Franco Brambilla as Mario 
 Maria Puccini as La moglie 
 Barbara Monis as La maestra 
 Graziella Antonelli as La sorella della maestra 
 Ugo Ceseri as Marcone 
 Umberto Sacripante as Il pazzo Tralicò 
 Graziela Betti as La ragazza del convento 
 Gino Viotti as Il sindaco 
 Cesare Zoppetti as L'assessore 
 Aristide Garbini as L'uscere 
 Italo Tancredi as L'infermiere 
 Andrea Checchi as Pompeo 
 Ugo Sasso as Uno squadrista

References

Bibliography 
 Gundle, Stephen. Mussolini's Dream Factory: Film Stardom in Fascist Italy. Berghahn Books, 2013.
 Moliterno, Gino. Historical Dictionary of Italian Cinema. Scarecrow Press, 2008.

External links 
 

1934 films
Italian drama films
Italian black-and-white films
1934 drama films
1930s Italian-language films
Films directed by Alessandro Blasetti
Films set in the 1920s
Films set in Italy
Films about fascists
Films about Fascist Italy
Fascist propaganda
1930s Italian films